Moscow ARZ ROSTO is a Russian charter airline based in Moscow as a unit of the Moscow Aviation-Repair Plant Rosto, established in 1997. It offers flights for hunting, advertising, aerial surveys and inspections, aerial herding, crop spraying and medical and emergency flights.

Fleet

External links

References

Defunct airlines of Russia
Companies based in Moscow